Aravinda Sametha Veera Raghava is a 2018 Indian Telugu-language action drama film written and directed by Trivikram Srinivas. The film stars N. T. Rama Rao Jr., Pooja Hegde and Jagapathi Babu. It revolves around Veera Raghava, a young man who engages in a violent fight with henchmen from rival village. He escapes to Hyderabad and decides to stay away from violence in order to bring peace between the two villages whose people have been constantly affected by the feud for 30 years. S. Thaman composed the soundtrack, in his official 100th musical composition.

Aravinda Sametha Veera Raghava was released theatrically on 11 October 2018 to positive reviews praising performances (especially N. T. Rama Rao Jr, Pooja Hegde and Jagapathi Babu), emotional weight of the story, action choreography, Trivikram's writing and direction, Thaman's soundtrack and background score. The film was a critical and commercial success. The film grossed  worldwide, becoming the second highest-grossing Telugu film of 2018. Jagapathi Babu won the Filmfare Best Supporting Actor Award for his performance.

Plot
A 30-year-long war between two rival faction groups from two villages in Kadapa—Kommaddi led by Narappa Reddy, and Nallagudi led by Basi Reddy. The war has been affecting the lives of people from both the gangs. Narappa Reddy's son Veera Raghava Reddy, who was in London for 12 years, returns to the village. On his way home, he ends up losing Narappa Reddy in an attack by Basi Reddy and his men, following which he undergoes a violent transformation and murders Basi Reddy's gangsters and stabs the latter himself, which makes everyone believes he has been murdered. Upon realizing that violence might not be the ultimate solution, Veera Raghava leaves for Hyderabad, hoping that the fights will reduce as the opposition will not have anyone to fight. He befriends a mechanic Neelambari, and circumstances force him into living with two women, Aravinda and Sunanda's family. 

Aravinda influences his beliefs and thoughts and falls for Veera Raghava. Meanwhile, Basi Reddy is found alive, and orders his gang, headed by his son Bala Reddy to find and capture Veera Raghava. Meanwhile, Veera Raghava helps Aravinda and Sunanda's younger brother Prateek in writing a story about violence for the school magazine, which is inspired by his own life. The story eventually gets published and seen by Basi Reddy, who realizes the similarities between the story and Veera Raghava's life. Basi Reddy orders his henchmen to kidnap Prateek from the school. The henchmen attempt to kidnap Prateek but are stopped by Veera Raghava, who fights them off while making sure nobody gets killed. He eventually learns from one of the gangsters that Basi Reddy is alive. Soon, Aravinda is kidnapped by Bala Reddy but rescued by Veera Raghava, who threatens him on the phone. 

Later, he explains his past to Aravinda and Sunanda and leaves for his village. Aravinda is intrigued and accompanied by Neelambari to Veera Raghava's village. They film a documentary about people affected by the corruption caused by the organized crime groups, while Veera Raghava attends a meeting with Bala Reddy and some ministers. He tries to convince them to stop the violence, but eventually fights off the henchmen when Bala Reddy refuses to comply. Veera Raghava manages to emotionally convince him of the peace treaty, who agrees. However, Basi Reddy learns of the peace treaty and murders Bala Reddy. Aravinda and Neelambari, who were staying at Basi Reddy's house since their car broke down, learn his truth and are held hostage. Veera Raghava is contacted by Basi Reddy, who calls him to an open field. Basi Reddy slits Aravinda's arm, stabs Neelambari, and attempts to fight Veera Raghava, who keeps dodging in an attempt to not start another fight. 

Basi Reddy tells that he killed Bala Reddy, and now no one would stand for peace but is shocked when his sidekicks Marappa and Subba, who have a change of heart listening to Veera Raghava's words, take Aravinda and Neelambari to the hospital despite being threatened. Enraged by Bala Reddy's death, who was his only hope of ending the violence, Veera Raghava murders Basi Reddy using a knife and sets him on fire so that no one can learn about his death. Veera Raghava confesses to Basi Reddy's wife that he has murdered Basi Reddy. The latter, who is heartbroken at her own son's death at her husband's hand, washes the weapon and takes Veera Raghava to the village. She files a complaint with the earlier corrupt police that her husband murdered her son and escaped, thereby ending the fight in the village. Veera Raghava nominates her as an MLA, which she wins unanimously.

Cast

 N. T. Rama Rao Jr. as Veera Raghava Reddy 
 Pooja Hegde as Aravindha, Raghava's love interest
 Eesha Rebba as Sunandha, Aravindha's younger sister
 Jagapathi Babu as Basi Reddy, Raghava's enemy
 Sunil as Neelambari, Raghava's friend
 Rao Ramesh as Krishna Reddy, Political in charge of Nallagudi
 Subhalekha Sudhakar as Sudarshan Reddy, Political in charge of Kommaddi
 Naga Babu as Narappa Reddy, Raghava's father
 Naveen Chandra as Bala Reddy, Basi Reddy's son
 Devayani as Suguna, Raghava's mother
 Naresh as Saradhi, Aravindha's father
 Lakshmi Gopalaswamy as Aravindha's mother
 Easwari Rao as Basi Reddy's wife
 Sithara as Varalakshmi, Raghava's aunt
 Brahmaji as Marappa Reddy, Basi Reddy's henchman
 Shatru as Subba Reddy “Ontichethi Subbadu”, Basi Reddy's henchman
 Supriya Pathak as Jeji, Raghava's grandmother
 Vinay Varma as Timma Reddy, Narapa Reddy's father and Raghava's grandfather
 Srinivasa Reddy as Balu, Saradhi's assistant
 Ravi Prakash as Oosanna Reddy, Narapa Reddy's henchman
 Sharath Lohitashwa as Lakshma Reddy, Basi Reddy's father
 Aadarsh Balakrishna as Basi Reddy's henchman
 Hari Teja as Nagamani, Raghava's henchman's wife
 Master Charan Ram as Prateek, Aravindha's younger brother
 Pammi Sai as Sudarshan
 Narra Srinivas as Rami Reddy
 Rangadham as Oobaa Reddy
 Ananth as Mechanic

Production 
The discussion for this film began with NTR, when Rao was shooting Nannaku Prematho in 2015 and finally materialised in 2018. Pooja Hegde was selected to collaborate with Rao. for the first time. Anirudh Ravichander, who was initially signed on composing the music was replaced by S. Thaman after the failure of Agnyaathavaasi.

The shooting for the film began on 6 April 2018 with an action sequence in Ramoji Film City of Hyderabad. Filming also took place in Pollachi in June. The shoot was completed in September 2018. Hegde dubbed her voice in Telugu for the first time in this film.

Themes 
Aravinda Sametha is based on the factionalism present in the region of Rayalaseema, a theme which was dominant in Telugu cinema during late 1990s and early 2000s.

Music

The soundtrack album of Aravinda Sametha Veera Raghava features four songs composed by S. Thaman, with one song being added in the extended soundtrack of the film. The audio rights were of the film were purchased by Zee Music Company. Lyrics for the songs were written by Sirivennela Seetharama Sastry, Ramajogayya Sastry, and Penchal Das. Initially, the makers planned to release the full audio album directly into the market, without hosting any audio launch event for the film.

The complete soundtrack album is scheduled to be unveiled on mid-September, without launching any singles from the film. However, the lyric video of the first single track titled "Anaganaganaga" was released on 15 September 2018, and the song was unveiled in all streaming platforms the same day. On 18 September 2018, the makers unveiled the second single track titled "Peniviti" sung by Kaala Bhairava, which was termed as an intense, raw, rustic number. The lyrical video of Yeda Poyinadu was released on 25 September 2018.

The tracklist was unveiled on 19 September 2018, and the complete soundtrack album was unveiled the following day, on 20 September 2018. The makers released the lyric videos and the promos of the songs before the film's release.

S. Thaman's work received praise from critics. Neetishta Nyayapati from The Times of India, stated it as "Despite featuring only four numbers, the jukebox of Aravindha Sametha sets itself apart with its authenticity. However, while the earthiness of the theme comes through the vocals and lyrics, it's missing in Thaman's music. Give this one a chance this weekend; you might just end up falling in love with the Seema dialect." 123Telugu reviewed it as, "There was a lot of expectation from Thaman as he was teaming up with Trivikram for the first time. But it looks like the ace composer has given importance to the emotions in the film rather than churning out commercial numbers. Peniviti and Anaganaganaga will be chartbusters and are our picks. Finally, the album of Aravinda Sametha is not your regular song and dance album and has been composed to gel with the narrative. It will grow on you slowly after watching the film on the big screen." Indiaglitz rated 3 out of 5 stars, and summarised it as "With just four songs, the album features two mood-based and two generic numbers." Cinejosh summarised it as "All in all, Aravinda Sametha weaves out a melodious album fitting in all the elements for an NTR and Trivikram combo film!"

Track listing

Extended soundtrack 
Though the album features four songs, a bonus track titled "Reddamma Thalli" sung by Penchal Das, and written by Ramajogayya Sastry, was released on 16 October 2018. The extended soundtrack, which contains the bonus track and complete background score, was released on 18 October 2018. In the album, the bonus song, consists of two versions; one of them is the original version sung by Mohana Bhogaraju. The other one sung by Penchal Das is the cover version of the song.

Marketing and release 
On 19 May 2018, the title of the film was revealed as Aravinda Sametha. Jr. NTR was featured in a chiseled avatar who worked out extensively with international trainer Lloyd Stevens for his new look for the film. Also S. Thaman's background music in the motion poster was appreciated by fans. The promotions of the film were commence on 10 September 2018.

A pre-release event was held on 2 October 2018, at H.I.C.C. Novotel hotel in Hyderabad, where the makers also launched the theatrical trailer of the film. The trailer received predominantly positive response from all corners.

Aravinda Sametha Veera Raghava was released theatrically on 11 October 2018. The film was dubbed and released in Tamil as Idhu Ennoda Jilla.

Reception

Critical reception 
The Times of India gave 3.5 out of 5 stars stating, "An emotional drama camouflaged in a commercial exterior, here's a film that's courageous to stand apart from slapstick madness. Trivikram's treatment of this plot scores over his indulgence as Jr NTR delivers another fine performance".

India Today gave 3 out of 5 stars stating, "Aravinda Sametha Veera Raghava is a commercial actioner backed by Trivikram's engaging script and Jr NTR's excellent performance. After the debacle of Pawan Kalyan-starrer Agnyaathavaasi, director Trivikram Srinivas has bounced back with Jr NTR's Aravinda Sametha Veera Raghava".

News18 gave 3 out of 5 stars stating "Jr NTR elevates tried-tested story of factionalism". Hindustan Times gave 3 out of 5 stars stating "Jr NTR is the torchbearer of peace in a film on factionalism".

Awards and nominations

References

External links 

2018 films
2018 action drama films
Indian action drama films
Films about violence
Indian films about revenge
Films directed by Trivikram Srinivas
Films scored by Thaman S
2010s Telugu-language films
Films about feuds